The Office for Emergency Management (OEM) was an office within the Executive Office of the United States President. It was established by administrative order, May 25, 1940, in accordance with executive order EO 8248, September 8, 1939. 

The office functioned to assist the President in clearing information on defense measures. It maintained liaison with national defense agencies and coordinated the national defense program.

The office was abolished progressively, with the Division of Information terminated by EO 9182, June 13, 1942; liaison functions terminated with resignation of Liaison Officer for Emergency Management (the OEM director), November 3, 1943; and Division of Central Administrative Affairs abolished, effective November 30, 1944, by EO 9471, August 25, 1944, with the Department of the Treasury named as liquidator.

Successor agencies
United States Civil Service Commission
United States Office of War Information (nonspecific functions of OEM's Division of Information)
Procurement Division of the United States Department of the Treasury
Public Buildings Administration (nonspecific functions of OEM's Division of Central Administrative Services)
Agency-specific functions of OEM-coordinated agencies reverted to those agencies.

See also 
Wayne Coy, OEM liaison officer

References

Records of the Office for Emergency Management (OEM)

Politics of World War II
Government agencies established in 1940
1940 establishments in the United States
1944 disestablishments in the United States
Establishments by United States executive order
Emergency Management